Wil Calhoun is an American television producer and writer.

He is best known for his work on the sitcom Friends for which he was nominated for a Primetime Emmy in 1999. In 2002, Calhoun along with Dan Schneider created the series What I Like About You starring Amanda Bynes and Jennie Garth. His other television credits include Jesse, Sons & Daughters, Caroline in the City, Kath & Kim and Gary Unmarried.

In 1990, he guest starred twice on the action series MacGyver, before pursuing a career behind the camera. He is still currently best friends with Richard Dean Anderson, who played Angus MacGyver.

References

External links

American television producers
American television writers
American male television writers
Living people
People from Baton Rouge, Louisiana
Year of birth missing (living people)
Screenwriters from Louisiana